Eye II Eye is the fourteenth studio album by the German hard rock band Scorpions, released in 1999. It is a radical departure in that Eye II Eye is much more pop-oriented than their previous work, which alienated some fans, despite the single "Mysterious" reaching number 26 on the Billboard Hot Mainstream Rock Tracks chart. It is the first studio Scorpions album to feature James Kottak on drums and also the final Scorpions studio album to feature Ralph Rieckermann on bass guitar.

For the first (and, thus far, only) time, Scorpions released a song recorded largely in German, namely "Du bist so schmutzig" ("You are so dirty").

Track listing

Personnel
Scorpions
Klaus Meine – lead vocals
Rudolf Schenker – rhythm guitars, backing vocals
Matthias Jabs – lead guitars, backing vocals
Ralph Rieckermann – bass, backing vocals
James Kottak – drums, backing vocals, co-lead vocals on "Du bist so schmutzig"

Additional musicians
Peter Wolf – keyboards and piano on "A Moment in a Million Years"
Michelle Wolf – backing vocals on "Skywriter" and "What U Give U Get Back"
Mick Jones – acoustic guitar on "10 Light Years Away"
Airway Allstars: Siedah Garrett, Lynn Davis, James Ingram, Phil Perry and Kevin Dorsey – backing vocals on "What U Give U Get Back"
Herman Rarebell – backing vocals on "Mind Like a Tree"

Production
Peter Wolf – producer, mixing of tracks 5, 6 and 14, arrangements with Scorpions
A.T., Christian Leitgeb, Paul Ericksen and Kenji Nagano – engineers
Bill Schnee – mixing
Chris Kimsey – mixing on track 2
Stephen Marcussen, Chris von Rautenkranz – mastering

Charts

Album

Singles

References

External links
 Official album page
 "To Be No. 1" video
 "A Moment in a Million Years" video
 "What U Give U Get Back" video

1999 albums
Scorpions (band) albums
albums produced by Peter Wolf
East West Records albums